Arpit Guleria (born 26 April 1997) is an Indian cricketer. He made his first-class debut for Himachal Pradesh in the 2018–19 Ranji Trophy on 28 November 2018. He made his List A debut on 13 October 2019, for Himachal Pradesh in the 2019–20 Vijay Hazare Trophy.

References

External links
 

1997 births
Living people
Indian cricketers
Place of birth missing (living people)
Himachal Pradesh cricketers